Atiqul Islam (born 1 July 1961) is a Bangladeshi politician, businessman and the current mayor of Dhaka North City Corporation. He was elected in the position in the by-election held on 28 February 2019 and took oath on 7 March. Earlier, he served as the president of Bangladesh Garment Manufacturers and Exporters Association (BGMEA) during 2013–14.

Early life
Islam was born on 1 July 1961 at Saidpur of Nilphamari district to Momtajuddin Ahmed and Majeda Khatun. His hometown is at Daudkandi Upazila (currently Titas Upazila) of Comilla and at the time of his birth, his father was posted at Saidpur. He is the youngest among his 11 siblings. He completed his secondary and higher secondary education from BAF Shaheen School and College.

Career
Islam and his elder brother Shafiqul Islam started the business in the garment sector of Bangladesh by establishing Islam Garments in 1985. He served as the President of Bangladesh Garment Manufacturers and Exporters Association (BGMEA) for the year 2013–14. He is serving as the president of the Centre of Excellence for Bangladesh Apparel Industry, which is responsible for improving the labor situation and product quality of Bangladesh in garment sectors. The Government of Bangladesh declared him a Commercially Important Person (CIP) on several occasions.

In September 2022, the government broke the trustee board of Manarat International University and created a new board with Islam appointed chairman.

Personal life and family
Islam is married to a dental surgeon, Shaila Shagufta Islam and the couple has a daughter, Bushra Afreen. Islam's father Momtajuddin Ahmed was a police officer who retired as Superintendent of Police (SP) in 1965. His brother Md. Tafazzul Islam served as the 17th Chief Justice of Bangladesh and another brother Md Mainul Islam is a retired lieutenant general of Bangladesh Army and former Principal staff Officer of Armed Forces Division, Chief of General Staff (CGS) of Bangladesh Army and Director General of Border Guards Bangladesh.

References

1961 births
Living people
People from Comilla District
Bangladeshi businesspeople
Awami League politicians
Mayors of Dhaka